Richard Elliot Doblin (born November 30, 1953) is an American drug activist and executive who is the founder and executive director of the Multidisciplinary Association for Psychedelic Studies (MAPS).

Life and career
Born in 1953, Doblin grew up in a Conservative Jewish family in suburban Chicago. He is the first of four children to pediatrician Morton Doblin and schoolteacher Arline Doblin. He has three younger siblings, Bruce, Sharon, and Stuart Doblin.

From 1975 until 1982, Doblin owned and operated a company called Braxas Construction, located in the Sarasota, Florida area, which specialized in relocating houses. In 2001 he received his doctorate in Public Policy from Harvard's Kennedy School of Government, where he wrote his dissertation on the regulation of the medical uses of psychedelics and marijuana and his Master's thesis on a survey of oncologists about smoked marijuana vs. the oral THC pill in nausea control for cancer patients.

Doblin obtained a psychology degree from New College of Florida in 1987. His undergraduate thesis at New College of Florida was a 25-year follow-up to the classic Good Friday Experiment, which evaluated the potential of psychedelic drugs to catalyze religious experiences. He also conducted a thirty-four year follow-up study to Timothy Leary’s Concord Prison Experiment. Rick studied with Dr. Stanislav Grof and was among the first to be certified as a Holotropic Breathwork practitioner.

He co-founded Earth Metabolic Design Laboratories in 1984 to support psychedelic research and Multidisciplinary Association for Psychedelic Studies (MAPS) in 1986 with the goal of making MDMA an FDA-approved medicine.

Rick Doblin's life is profiled in former Washington Post Magazine editor Tom Shroder's book Acid Test: LSD, Ecstasy, and the Power to Heal.

On July 9, 2019, TED released a talk featuring Rick Doblin titled "The Future of Psychedelic-Assisted Therapy." As of July 7, 2022, the video had over 4 million views.

Doblin married Lynne Doblin in 1993. Together they have three children Eden, Lilah, and Eliora and live in Boston, Massachusetts.

Controversy
As director of MAPS, Doblin has given comment on the publicised allegations of sexual assault by MAPS-employed therapists engaging in a clinical trial trialling psychedelic MDMA as therapy for survivors of sexual assault. Four years after Meaghan Buisson submitted a formal complaint to MAPS regarding the series of incidents, Doblin defended the organisation failing to review all videos of the sessions, stating "This unethical sexual misconduct happened after the therapy was over … So that made us think that we didn't need to review the video."

Bibliography

 

 Regulation of the Medical Use of Psychedelics and Marijuana . A dissertation by R. Doblin for his Ph.D. in Public Policy from the Kennedy School of Government, Harvard University. June 2002.

See also

References

The MAPS Staff
Erowid character vaults
Miliard, Mike: This is your brain on drugs: Rick Doblin thinks pot, ecstasy, and other psychedelics could unlock the human mind — and he wants to bring them to Harvard, the FDA, and a doctor’s office near you, The Boston Phoenix, Oct. 8–14, 2004.
 
 

Psychedelic drug researchers
New College of Florida alumni
1953 births
Living people
20th-century American Jews
American psychedelic drug advocates
Harvard Kennedy School alumni
People from Belmont, Massachusetts
Breathwork practitioners
21st-century American Jews